David Low Way is a  Australian road connecting the many coastal townships of the Sunshine Coast with the two large city centres of Maroochydore in the south and Noosa Heads in the north. The route is an alternative coastal route to the Sunshine Motorway and passes through the sugar and fruit growing town of Bli Bli and then crosses the Sunshine Motorway. The road then travels north along the coast, through many coastal towns to the terminus at Noosa Heads.

It is named after David Low, a local Member of the Queensland Legislative Assembly. The first stage of the road was opened between Sunshine Beach and Peregian Beach on April 2, 1960, by the Queensland Premier of the time, Frank Nicklin.

Upgrade

Cycle facility
A project to provide a cycle facility at Marcoola and Mudjimba, at a cost of $5.7 million, was partially completed in December 2020, with another stage to follow.

Major intersections

References

Highways in Queensland